Raphitoma lennieri is an extinct species of sea snail, a marine gastropod mollusc in the family Raphitomidae.

Description

Distribution
Fossils of this extinct marine species were found in Eocene strata in France.

References

 Cossmann (M.) & Pissarro (G.), 1900 Faune éocènique du Cotentin. 1er article. Bulletin de la Société Géologique de Normandie, t. 19, p. 19-75

lennieri
Gastropods described in 1900